Larri Merritt (born July 22, 1998), professionally known as Larray, is an American YouTuber and social media influencer. He produces comedic video content on his YouTube channel, and is part of the collaborative TikTok collective known as The Hype House. After initially gaining prominence on Vine, he started uploading videos onto YouTube after the former became defunct.

Career 
Before becoming a former member of The Hype House in January 2020 to late 2020, he had accumulated over 6 million subscribers on his personal YouTube channel, in addition to approximately 12.8 million followers on his personal TikTok account. He was nominated in the Breakout Creator category at the 9th Streamy Awards in December 2019. His three novelty songs "First Place," "Last Place" and "Canceled" together spent 42 weeks on Billboard's Comedy Digital Tracks chart before its abolishment in January 2020, with the former gaining over 41 million views on YouTube, and ranking at number 13 on the 2018 year-end chart.

In August 2022, he launched a virtual restaurant that sells mac and cheese.

COVID-19 pandemic controversy 
On July 21, 2020, Nikita Dragun held a surprise birthday party for Merritt during the COVID-19 pandemic. The party included social media personalities such as James Charles, Charli D'Amelio, Dixie D'Amelio, and others. At the time of the party, California's COVID-19 cases had just surpassed New York's cases. There was an estimated 67 people in attendance, many of whom were seen without face masks despite local health recommendations. Photos and videos of the event appeared on social media sites such as Instagram. These posts drew criticism from the public, including other influencers like Elijah Daniel and Tyler Oakley. Merritt, and some of the other attendees, later apologized. Residents of the Hype House later tested negative for COVID-19.

Discography

Singles

Other charted songs

Awards and nominations

References

Living people
1998 births
People from Los Angeles
American TikTokers
American YouTubers
Gay entertainers
LGBT YouTubers
20th-century LGBT people
21st-century LGBT people
LGBT TikTokers